Derris is genus of leguminous plants found in Southeast Asia and the southwest Pacific islands, including New Guinea. The roots of D. elliptica contain rotenone, a strong insecticide and fish poison.

Despite the secondary compounds found in Derris, they serve as food plants for many Lepidopteran larvae  including Batrachedra spp.

Selected species
The Plant List includes the following:
 Derris cumingii
 Derris elegans
 Derris elliptica
 Derris ferruginea
 Derris malaccensis
 Derris marginata
 Derris microphylla
 Derris ovalifolia
 Derris parviflora 
 Derris philippinensis
 Derris polyantha
 Derris robusta
 Derris scandens
 Derris trifoliata, also known as the common derris

See also
 "Derris" insecticides based on rotenone
 Millettia pinnata: D. indica is a synonym.

References

External links

Millettieae
Fabaceae genera